Engenheiro Rubens Paiva Station is a subway station on the Rio de Janeiro Metro that services the neighbourhood of Pavuna in the North Zone of Rio de Janeiro.

References

Metrô Rio stations
Railway stations opened in 1998
1998 establishments in Brazil